Hans-Jürgen Schüler (born 15 August 1945) is a German water polo player. He competed in the men's tournament at the 1968 Summer Olympics.

References

External links
 

1945 births
Living people
German male water polo players
Olympic water polo players of East Germany
Water polo players at the 1968 Summer Olympics
People from Eckartsberga
Sportspeople from Saxony-Anhalt